Jelačići (Cyrillic: Јелачићи) is a village in the municipalities of Šekovići (Republika Srpska) and Kladanj, Bosnia and Herzegovina.

Demographics 
According to the 2013 census, its population was 5, all Serbs living in the Šekovići part thus none in the Kladanj part.

References

Populated places in Kladanj
Populated places in Šekovići
Serb communities in the Federation of Bosnia and Herzegovina